Terike Haapoja (born 1974) is a Finnish visual artist, based in New York City. In 2016, Haapoja won the ANTI Festival International Prize for Live Art. She has also been awarded Dukaatti prize (2008), the Säde prize (2009) and she received honorary mention for artist of the year in 2007 at Finland’s Festival.

Haapoja’s work investigates the existential and political boundaries of the world, exploring things like nature, death and other species, she questions how different structures of exclusion and discrimination function as foundations for identity and culture. Haapoja approaches these themes by building large projects in the form of installations. Her work also consists of videos and staged projects that are characterised by the use of new media and new technology. Her work has been shown widely in solo and group exhibitions and festivals, both nationally and internationally.

Haapoja represented Finland in the 55. Venice Biennale with a solo exhibition Closed Circuit – Open Duration in the Nordic Pavilion. She gained notoriety from her work, Museum of Nonhumanity, that was created alongside Finnish author . Museum of Nonhumanity has been exhibited in Taipei Biennale (2019), Santarcangelo Festival (2017) and Momentum Biennial (2017), and as part of the summer exhibition Animals and Us at Turner Contemporary, Margate. In 2016, Haapoja and Gustafsson were both awarded with the Finnish State Media Art Award. In 2022 Haapoja was awarded Guggenheim fellowship.

Haapoja has an MA degree from the Finnish Academy of Fine Arts and Theatre Academy. She is also currently a member of the board of trustees of the Finnish Cultural Institute in New York. She was also a founding member and a chair of board of Checkpoint Helsinki, a Helsinki-based art organisation now under the name PUBLICS.

Personal life
Haapoja is of Hungarian descent through her father.

References

Living people
1974 births
Finnish expatriates in the United States
Finnish people of Hungarian descent
Finnish women artists
Finnish video artists
Women video artists